Min Jul is the third album of Norwegian Singer Maria Arredondo and also her first Norwegian-language album, released by Universal Music Norway in 2005. No music videos were included in this album. The album went platinum.

Track listing 
 Himmel På Jord
 Glade Jul
 Sonjas Sang Til Julestjernen
 Jeg Er Så Glad Hver Julekveld
  Klagesang
 Deilig Er Jorden
  Det Lyser I Stille Grender
  Ledet Av En Stjerne
  Det Kimer Nå Til Julefest
  En Stjerne Skinner I Natt
  Det Hev Ei Rose Sprunge
  When You Wish Upon A Star
  Nå Tennes Tusen Julelys
Written-By – Enger* (tracks: I), Hegeland* (tracks: 3), Balle* (tracks: 9), Monn-Iversen* (tracks: 3), Køhler* (tracks: 13), 
Skeie* (tracks: 10), Grüber* (tracks: 2), Layritz* (tracks: 11), Mørk* (tracks: 8), Sande* (tracks: 7), Johannesen* (tracks: 1), Mohr* (tracks: 2), Harline* (tracks: 12), Landstad* (tracks: 4), Wexelsen* (tracks: 4), McGurk* (tracks: 5), Washington* (tracks: 12), Grundtvig* (tracks: 9), Knudsen* (tracks: 4), Hognestad* (tracks: 11), Løvland* (tracks: 8), Dagsland* (tracks: V), Beck* (tracks: 7), Aas* (tracks: 10), Trad.* (tracks: 6, 13)

Credits 
Arranged By – Eirik Berge (tracks: 1 to 5, 8, 10), Jon Lord (tracks: 6, 9, 11), Kjetil Bjerkestrand (tracks: 13), Ronny Wikmark (tracks: 1, 4), Tormod Tvete Vik (tracks: 7, 12). 
Bass – Gjermund Silseth* 
Fiddle – Gjermund Larsen (tracks: 8) 
Guitar [Lap Steel] – Skjalg Raaen (tracks: 4) 
Hardingfele – Gjermund Larsen (tracks: 9) 
Harp – Johanna Nousiainen (tracks: 6, 9, 11) 
Keyboards – Kjetil Bjerkestrand (tracks: 13), Ronny Wikmark (tracks: 1 to 6, 8 to 11) 
Mixed By, Producer – Bjørn Nessjø 
Oboe – Steffen Blindheim (tracks: 2, 3, 5, 8, 11) 
Orchestra – Trondheimsolistene (tracks: 1 to 7) 
Organ – Jon Lord (tracks: 6, 9) 
Percussion – Ronny Wikmark (tracks: 1, 2, 4, 5, 10), Rune Arnesen (tracks: 13) 
Piano – Eirik Berge (tracks: 1 to 5, 8, 10), Jon Lord (tracks: 6, 9, 11), Kjetil Bjerkestrand (tracks: 13) 
Technician – Kjartan Meinseth, Peer Espen Ursfjord*, Rune Nordal 
Technician, Producer [Assisitant] – Bjørn Pedersen, Ronny Wikmark 
Artwork By – Claudia C. Sandor, Halvor Bodin Photography – Espen, Lasse Berre, Rune

References 

2006 albums
Maria Arredondo albums
Universal Music Norway albums